Destiny of the Daleks is the first serial of the 17th season of the British science fiction television series Doctor Who, which was first broadcast in four weekly parts on BBC1 from 1 September to 22 September 1979. The story introduces Lalla Ward as the newly regenerated Romana.

It is set on the planet Skaro centuries after events of the 1975 serial Genesis of the Daleks. The Daleks arrive on Skaro to find their creator Davros (David Gooderson) in suspended animation. They seek his guidance to help them beat the Movellan race with whom the Daleks are in a stalemated war.

Plot

K9 has lost his voice, and the Fourth Doctor is confused as to why a robot would have laryngitis. Romana, for reasons unknown, regenerates, choosing the form of Princess Astra of the planet Atrios, in spite of the Doctor's initial disapproval of it.

The TARDIS lands on a rocky planet. The Doctor and Romana see a group of ragged-looking humans burying one of their dead, followed by a spaceship landing and half-burying itself in the ground in a valley. As the Doctor and Romana are about to investigate, underground explosions force them back towards the ruins. Whilst exploring them, another explosion occurs, trapping the Doctor.  Romana returns to the TARDIS to reassemble K9 so he can assist, but finds the TARDIS half-buried in rubble and the Doctor is missing. As she turns to leave, a man who has been following her blocks her path. She backs away, falls down a rubble chute, and loses consciousness. She recovers only to have three Daleks burst through the wall and capture her, commanding her to work at a drilling site.

Meanwhile, the Doctor is thanking the white-clad, silver-haired humanoids who have rescued him, remarking on their strength. He asks their leader, Commander Sharrel, where he is, and is told that the planet is D-5-Gamma-Z-Alpha, otherwise known as Skaro. The Doctor learns that the Movellans are here to wage war against the Daleks. Two Movellans bring in a new prisoner, the man who has been following the Doctor and Romana.  He is Starship Engineer Tyssan. He reveals that the Daleks used him as slave labour as part of a search operation. He tells the Doctor about what has happened to Romana, and they set out to rescue her.

The Doctor, Tyssan, and three Movellans find Romana and head into the Dalek headquarters.  The Doctor establishes that the Daleks are searching for something on a level that they have yet to access, and remembers an alternative route to this area, so they make their way to this floor. There they discover Davros, the creator of the Daleks, who was in suspended animation and  slowly comes to life.

The Doctor moves the revived Davros into a blocked-off room in the ruins of the Dalek city. They talk about the Daleks' "accomplishments" during the thousands of years he has been in suspended animation, and while the Doctor comments on the lives the Daleks have ruined, Davros replies that the Daleks have only just begun their conquest of the cosmos. Daleks find them both, and the Doctor holds Davros hostage with a makeshift explosive, bargaining with the Daleks to free all their prisoners and to let him escape. Davros makes them see that the Doctor's logic is "impaired by irrational sentiment" and the Daleks comply. The Daleks remove the explosive and Davros vows to make them invincible, the supreme power of the universe.

Romana reaches the Movellan spaceship; but learns that they are not as altruistic as they appear when they knock her out. The Movellans test their nova device: a weapon which changes air molecules so that a planet's atmosphere becomes flammable and can be set alight, killing all life. The Doctor meets up with Tyssan and they find a female Movellan scout. The Doctor confirms his suspicion that the Movellans are actually robots by removing the power pack on her belt and deactivating her. He finds Romana but is captured by the Movellans.

The Doctor learns that the Daleks and Movellans have been in a stalemate for two centuries and that both sides' battle computers have been calculating the best strategy and precise moment at which to attack. So far, not a single shot has been fired. The Daleks want Davros to help them gain an advantage. The Movellans want the Doctor to do the same for them. The Doctor refuses. Davros is eager to give the Daleks the upper hand. He orders them to make a suicide bombing attack on the Movellan craft. Meanwhile, Tyssan leads the prisoners in an attack on the Movellans, deactivating them all, while Romana disables the Movellan's Commander before he can set off the nova device.

The Doctor tells Davros that the Movellans have been disabled; Davros does not believe him and still intends to destroy the Movellan ship. As Daleks approach the ship, the Doctor goes to detonate the bombs but is ambushed by a Dalek, which holds him at gunpoint. The Doctor throws his hat on the Dalek's eyestalk, blinding it, then destroys it with one of the remaining bombs. He then detonates the bombs on the Dalek suicide squad before it reaches the Movellan ship.

The Doctor then puts Davros into the custody of the former slave workers. He is placed in cryogenic suspension and taken to Earth to stand trial for his crimes. The Doctor and Romana leave, remarking on the fact that whoever makes mistakes often wins.

Outside references
The Doctor reads Oolon Colluphid's book The Origins of the Universe and says he got it wrong "on the first line". Colluphid is a character from The Hitchhiker's Guide to the Galaxy written by script editor Douglas Adams, who inserted the reference to his own work.

Production

This was Dalek creator Terry Nation's last script for Doctor Who; he declined several further offers due to the extensive uncredited story rewrite by script editor Douglas Adams, who claimed on several occasions that Nation had not delivered a script but simply several pages of story notes that rehashed previous Dalek stories. Ken Grieve, director of the serial, claimed on the DVD commentary that Adams wrote 98% of the script. Nation moved to the United States in 1980 and went on to work for various television projects in America, most famously as a writer and producer for MacGyver.

Michael Wisher was unavailable to reprise the role of Davros, as he was on tour in Australia. David Gooderson replaced him, but the Davros mask (which was originally fitted for Wisher) was five years old and in poor condition; as a result, it suffers in appearance. K9 only appears near the start of the story, explained in-story as due to an electronic form of laryngitis – the croaking was provided by Roy Skelton. K9's absence was because the prop was unsuitable for the large amount of location filming — the production team had suffered several problems using K9 on a similar location in The Stones of Blood, and were not keen on repeating the experience. Terry Nation has said he had no desire to use K9 in his storyline; the scene (as well as other continuity gestures to Season 16) was inserted during rewrites by Douglas Adams.

Winspit Quarry in Dorset was used for the planet Skaro, also used were the quarry's small stone cottage and two larger brick buildings, (which all stood side by side and were just empty derelict shells, with their roofs missing). The BBC added to the flooring of the two larger buildings a large number of silver coloured cylinders and pipes, sticking out of the rubble, which transformed these two derelict shells into the external ruins of the long abandoned Dalek city and the disused Kaled bunkers.

This was one of the first British productions to make use of a Steadicam; due to the high cost of such a set-up, nearly all the props and sets were reused, including the Davros mask.

The instalments are credited onscreen as "episodes", rather than "parts" – the only serial made after The Green Death to do so. In the next story, City of Death, it was returned to "parts".

Cast notes
Tim Barlow, who played Tyssan, was deaf at the time of filming.

Tony Osoba later played Kracauer in the 1987 serial Dragonfire and Duke in the 2014 episode "Kill the Moon". David Yip later played Curly in the audio play The Girl Who Never Was.

Broadcast and reception

When Episode One was broadcast, ITV was three weeks into a ten-week strike, which took it entirely off air with the exception of the Channel region, and all BBC programmes received a significant audience boost as a result. Episode Three broke the record for the highest-rated episode of Doctor Who, set by an omnibus repeat of Pyramids of Mars on 27 November 1976: this was broken again the following week. According to the BBC's Audience Research Report, the serial was received positively, especially amongst children. The Daleks and Baker were praised, though the response to Ward was more mixed. The story was repeated on BBC1 across four consecutive evenings from Tuesday to Friday, 5–8 August 1980, achieving viewing figures of 4.9, 5.8, 7.1, and 6.5 million viewers respectively.

Paul Cornell, Martin Day, and Keith Topping wrote in The Discontinuity Guide (1995) that the serial had "a tacky, inconsequential feel that comes from a decade of having its best jokes sneered at." In The Television Companion (1998), David J. Howe and Stephen James Walker criticised Romana's bizarre regeneration, the implication that the Daleks were now robots, and David Gooderson's Davros, believing the character was not only harmed by being played by a lesser actor but that he was also not as well written. Despite this, they said the story "ultimately manages to rise above all its undoubted failings and provides a fair degree of entertainment." In 2011, Mark Braxton of Radio Times wrote that the Daleks lacked menace and the script could be too comedic at times, but in spite of its flaws it was "clattering good fun". The A.V. Club reviewer Christopher Bahn praised the first episode and the introduction of the new Romana, but felt the story quickly became dull, mishandled Davros, and failed to do anything with the Daleks. Ian Berriman of SFX gave Destiny of the Daleks two out of five stars, criticising the Daleks as robots and much of the comedy. He also noted that it looked "shabby".

Commercial releases

In print

Terrance Dicks' novelisation, published by Target Books in November 1979, was released two months after transmission – one of the quickest Doctor Who novelisations, before any of the previous season's stories. A German translation was published by Goldmann in 1990.

Home media
Destiny of the Daleks was released on VHS in July 1994. In 2001 it was remastered and re-released as part of The Davros Collection, which consisted of Genesis of the Daleks, Destiny of the Daleks, Resurrection of the Daleks, Revelation of the Daleks, and Remembrance of the Daleks. It was released on DVD on 26 November 2007, both on its own and as part of the Davros Collection DVD box set (as listed above). This serial was also released as part of the Doctor Who DVD Files in issue 58 on 23 March 2011. It was further remastered in 2021 and released on Blu-ray as part of Doctor Who The Collection Season 17 on 20 December 2021. The soundtrack, with linking narration by Lalla Ward, was released on vinyl by Demon Records on 13 April 2019.

See also
Dalek variants
History of the Daleks

References

External links

Target novelisation

Fourth Doctor serials
Dalek television stories
Doctor Who serials novelised by Terrance Dicks
Television episodes written by Terry Nation